Kaneland Community Unit School District 302 (D302) is a school district headquartered in Maple Park, Illinois. It is within southwest Kane County. It was established through consolidation of existing school districts on July 1, 1948.

Schools
 Secondary
 Kaneland High School
 Harter Middle School

 Primary
 Blackberry Creek Elementary School
 McDole Elementary School
 John Shields Elementary School
 John Stewart Elementary School

References

External links
 

School districts in Kane County, Illinois
1948 establishments in Illinois
School districts established in 1948
Education in Aurora, Illinois